Philo Records was founded in 1973 by half-brothers Michael Couture and Bill Schubart to record and distribute folk and traditional music. Over the course of its nine-year history, before its sale  to Rounder Records in 1982, Philo produced roughly 100 albums of folk, traditional, and later, jazz, world, and new music from a converted barn-studio in North Ferrisburg, Vermont. Philo's allure to many established and emerging artists was its policy of giving them full control over their productions and repertoire.

Early years
Philo Records (as distinct from the Philo Records founded in California in 1945 by Eddie, Leo and Ira Messner, a jazz and R&B label) was founded in 1973 in a barn in North Ferrisburg, Vermont by half-brothers Bill Schubart and Michael Couture. The two brothers shared a love of eclectic music and Couture was himself a performing musician, while Schubart had long dabbled in recording various folk and classical groups. Schubart bought a vacant dairy barn on eight acres in 1969 that had been recently used to raise pigs, steam-cleaned it and elicited the help of an architect friend, Arthur Norcross, to create a home recording studio. The studio opened as Earth Audio Techniques in 1972. Schubart and Couture founded Philo Records to produce and distribute some of the music they had recorded at Earth Audio.

The first two releases in 1973 were Philo 1000 The UVM Choral Union performing The Psalmody and Fuguing tunes of Justin Morgan (of Morgan Horse fame) and Philo 2000 Louis Beaudoin, the soon to become renowned French-Canadian fiddler. These two releases loosely defined the 1000 series of more popular releases and the 2000 series that was more strictly roots or traditional music. In 1979, the 9000 series was added to include jazz, world and new music releases.

Philo’s aesthetic hallmark was its artist-centered culture. The prevailing industry employment of sA&R (artists & repertoire) executives who choose material, hire arrangers and sidemen, and then oversee the production of market-ready music was never adopted at Philo. Schubart and Couture chose musicians, not for only their renown, but for their ability to perform live outside the studio. They often opted to record unknown artists whose work they respected and gave them full control over their own production and choice of sidemen. Their goal was to capture on LP the artist’s own vision of their music. There was no prescribed company vision. This, of course, cut both ways. The company produced a number of releases that received significant critical acclaim but sold only a few hundred copies. It also led to considerable success and the debut of a number of new faces in the folk, traditional and, later, new music fields such as: Tom Mitchell, Kilimanjaro, Mary McCaslin and Jim Ringer

Engineers

Resident engineers included co-founders Michael Couture and Bill Schubart, and also Chas Eller and David Green. Gregg Lamping served as the technical engineer.

Artists
Philo’s better known artists included Mary McCaslin, Jim Ringer, Jean Carignan (Canada), Dave van Ronk, Rosalie Sorrels, Jean Redpath, The Boys of the Lough, Utah Phillips, The New Black Eagle Jazz Band, Bill Staines, Kilimanjaro, Patty Larkin, Martin Grosswendt, and Nanci Griffith.

Bought by Rounder Records

In 1979, the music industry suffered major losses from piracy and the collapse of the two-tier distribution system. In that year, Philo saw two of its major distributors fail and the significant loss of receivables triggered a chapter 11 filing under which Philo sought bankruptcy protection. The label limped along for two and a half more years continuing to pay down its debts and then sold itself to Rounder Records which assumed the label name and catalog of artists.
Rounder proved to be a good steward, keeping many of the albums available and converting many to the then-new CD format. Rounder added other well-known artists to the roster including: Ray Wylie Hubbard, Ellis Paul, Bill Morrissey, Iris Dement, Carrie Newcomer, Christine Lavin, Vance Gilbert and Cliff Eberhardt. In the continuing consolidation of a collapsing music media industry, Rounder itself was sold to Concord Music Group in April 2010.

Master List / Discography
Philo 1000 Vermont Harmony I: UVM Choral Union, arr. Dr. James Chapman (1973)
Philo 1001 Margaret MacArthur
Philo 1002 Craig Morton: The Liverpool Judies (1973)
Philo 1003 Jim Brewer, 1974
Philo 1004 Utah Phillips: Good Though (1973)
Philo 1005 Owen McBride, 1973
Philo 1006 10th Annual Old Time Fiddlers Conference at Craftsbury (1973)
Philo 1007 Lazy Bill Lucas, 1974
Philo 1008 Kenny Hall, 1974
Philo 1010 Eric & Marty Nagler (Beers family): Gentleness in Living (1973)
Philo 1011 Mary McCaslin: Way Out West (1973) 
Philo 1012 Jim Ringer: Good to Get Home (1974)
Philo 1013 Billy Vanaver and Livia Drapkin
Philo 1014 Priscilla Herdman: the Water Lily
Philo 1015 Bodie Wagner, Hobo (1975)
Philo 1016 Utah Phillips: El Capitan (1975)
Philo 1017 Glenn Ohrlin: Cowboy Songs
Philo 1019 Rev. Baybie Hoover & Virginia Brown
Philo 1020 Sara Cleveland (1975)
Philo 1021 Jim Ringer Any Old Wind (1974)
Philo 1022 Ted Ashlaw: Adirondack Woods Singer
Philo 1023 Jay & Lynn Ungar
Philo 1024 Mary McCaslin: Prairie in the Sky (1975)
Philo 1026 The Boys of the Lough:  Live at Passim (1975) 
Philo 1027 Tom Mitchell (1976)
Philo 1028 National Folk Festival
Philo 1029 Rosalie Sorrels
Philo 1030 Fred Holstein: Chicago & Other Ports (1977)
Philo 1031 Boys of the Lough: Lochaber No More (1976)
Philo 1032 Lew London
Philo Utah Phillips: The Telling Takes Me Home  (1976)
Philo 1033 Rosalie Sorrels: Moments of Happiness (1976–77)
Philo 1034 Doris Abrahams: Labor of Love (1976)
Philo 1036 Dave van Ronk:  Sunday Street
Philo 1037 Jean Redpath The Songs of Robert Burns Vol. I, arr. Serge Hovey (1976)
Philo 1038 VT Choral Union:  Vermont Harmony II, cond. Dr. James Chapman (1976)
Philo 1040 Jay and Lynn Ungar
Philo 1041 Martin Grosswendt: Dog on a Dance Floor (1979)
Philo 1042 Boys of the Lough: The Piper’s Broken Finger
Philo 1044 Bill Lucas
Philo 1045 John Lutz 
Philo 1046 Mary McCaslin: Old Friends (1977)
Philo 1047 Jim Ringer: Tramps & Hawkers (1977)
Philo 1048 Jean Redpath: Songs of Robert Burns Vol. II, arr. Serge Hovey (1980)
Philo 1049 Rosalie Sorrels
Philo 1050 Utah Phillips The Telling Takes Me Home(1979)
Philo 1051 The Boys of the Lough
Philo 1052 Eric von Schmidt: Champagne Don’t Hurt Me Baby
Philo 1053 Huxtable, Christensen & Hood: Wallflowers (1980)
Philo 1054 Jean Redpath: Song of the Seals (1978)
Philo 1055 Jim Ringer & Mary McCaslin: The Bramble and the Rose 
Philo 1056 Do’a Light Upon Light (1978)
Philo 1058 Winnie Winston: Steel Wool 
Philo 1061 Jean Redpath: Father Adam
Philo 1062 VT Choral Union: An Early New England Christmas (1978)
Philo 1065 Dave van Ronk (1979)
Philo 1066 Jean Redpath Lowlands
Philo 1068 Jean Redpath, Lisa Neustadt & The Angel Band: Shout for Joy
Philo 1071 Jean Redpath: The Songs of Robert Burns Vol.  III arr. Serge Hovey
Philo 1072 Jean Redpath: The Songs of Robert Burns Vol. IV arr by Serge Hovey
Philo 1075 Mary McCaslin: the Best of… 	(1981)
Philo 1076 Utah Phillips: unreleased  (1983)
Philo 1078 Robert J. Lurtsema: Christmas Stories
Philo 1079 Mason Daring
Philo Bill Staines (1981)
Philo 1082 Jean Redpath w Abby Newton: Haydn Scottish Songs
Philo 1086 The New Black Eagle Jazz Band: At Symphony Hall (1982)
Philo 1087 Patty Larkin: I’m Fine  // Redpath? 
Philo PHC 1091 Jim Ringer & Mary McCaslin: Bramble and the Rose (1978)
Philo 1092 Jon Gailmor
Philo 1093 Jean Redpath : The Songs of Robert Burns Vol. V, arr. Serge Hovey (1983-4)
Philo 1096 Nanci Griffith: Once in a Very Blue Moon
Philo 1097 Nanci Griffith There’s a Light Beyond These Woods
Philo 1099 Mary McCaslin: Sunny California (Leased to Mercury as SRM-1-3772 Produced by Philo)
Philo Patty Larkin: Step Into the Light (1985)
Philo PH 1118 Bill Staines (1987)
Philo Ray Wylie Hubbard Dangerous Spirits
Philo Maura O’Connell: Just in Time 1988
Philo Nanci Griffith: Last of the True Believers (1986)
Philo Ray Wylie Hubbard Crusdaes of the Restless Knight
Philo Ray Wylie Hubbard Eternal & Lowdown
Philo Ray Wylie Hubbard Delirium Tremolos (2005)

Philo 9000 Do’a Ornament of Hope (digital)
Philo 9001 Kilimanjaro (1980)
Philo 9002 Lar Duggan: The Lake Studies (1980)
Philo 9003 Laurie Spiegel: The Expanding Universe (1977)
Philo 9004 Do’a Ancient Beauty (1981)
Philo 9005 Kilimanjaro II
Philo 9006 Ancient Future
Philo 9007 Tony Vacca & Tim Moran w Don Cherry:  City Spirits (1985)
Philo 9008 Elements with Mark Egan and Danny Gottlieb
Philo 9009 Do’a: Companions of the Crimson Ark

Philo 2000 Louis Beaudoin, 1973
Philo 2001 Jean Carignan, 1973
Philo 2002 Henri Landry
Philo 2003 Philippe Bruneau, 1973
Philo 2004 Joe Heaney
Philo 2005 John McGreevy and Seamus Cooley (1974)
Philo 2006 Philippe Bruneau:  Danses pour veillées canadiennes
Philo 2007 La Famille Verret
Philo 2008 Joe Heaney
Philo 2009 Collection Québécoise
Philo 2012 Jean Carignan
Philo 2013 La Bolduc
Philo 2014 Jean d’Arc Charlebois  (1975)
Philo 2015 Jean Redpath: First Flight
Philo 2018 Jean Carignan
Philo 2019 Shetland Fiddling
Philo 2022 La Famille Beaudoin

Philo 41069 Lil Labbe
Philo 01DT Mary McCaslin/ Jim Ringer Live at the Bottom Line
EP 001 The Decentz
Philo 41067 Norwegian Fiddling

Fretless 111 Bill Russell: From Old Leaves (1975)
Fretless 112 John Nutting: Songs of Lamoille County, Vermont (1975)
Fretless 114 Papa John Kolstad & Wildman Turk: Beans Taste Fine
Fretless 115 Peter & John Isaacson
Fretless 119 Rodney & Randy Miller: Castles in the Airs (1975)
Fretless 120 Gilby Hager (1975)
Fretless 121 Joan Crane: Dirt Pusher Blues (1976)
Fretless FR 134 Lui Collins Made in New England (1978)
Fretless 138: Lisa Neustadt & the Angel Band: Angels Hovering Round
Fretless 153: County Down
Fretless 154 Lisa Neustadt & the Angel Band: Anywhere is Home
Fretless 165: County Down: Living in the Country

References

American record labels
Folk record labels